is a Japanese manga artist who created Grander Musashi, which was adapted into two anime series. Akira Toriyama had an influence on his art style. He is also responsible for illustrating , which was adapted from Pokémon - Destiny Deoxys.

Works 
 Grander Musashi
 Pocket Monsters: Rekkuu no Houmonsha - Deoxys
 Ash & Pikachu
 Ash & Pichu
 Pocket Monsters Battrio

External links 
 

Living people
Manga artists
Year of birth missing (living people)